Villa Hidalgo is a village in Nayarit, Mexico.

References

Populated places in Nayarit